Darwinia carnea, commonly known as Mogumber bell or Narrogin bell, is a species of flowering plant in the myrtle family Myrtaceae and is endemic to the south-west of Western Australia. It is a small shrub with narrow, keeled leaves and flowers in groups of about eight, surrounded by yellowish-green to pinkish-red bracteoles. It occurs in small, isolated populations near the towns which contribute to its common names. It is the only "bell-flowered" Darwinia to not grow in the Stirling Range National Park.

Description

Flowering occurs between October and December and is followed by fruit which is a small, non-fleshy nut.

Taxonomy
The first formal description of D. carnea was published by Charles Gardner in 1923 in Royal Society of Western Australia. He collected the type specimen between Mogumber and New Norcia. The specific epithet (carnea) is a Latin word meaning "flesh" referring to the colour of the floral bracts.

Distribution and habitat
There is only one small population near Narrogin and three near Mogumber, all on private property. They occur on gravelly hilltops or lateritic breakaways in heathy woodland. Three translocated populations have been established in nature reserves.

Conservation
Darwinia carnea is classified as "Threatened Flora (Declared Rare Flora — Extant)" by the Western Australian Government Department of Parks and Wildlife and a Recovery Plan has been prepared. It has also been listed as "Endangered" (EN) under the Australian Government Environment Protection and Biodiversity Conservation Act 1999 (EPBC Act).

This darwinia may always have been rare. The farmer was not prepared to fence off such a large paddock from his sheep. On a subsequent visit to the property, botanists were unable to find any D. carnea.

Use in horticulture
Darwinia carnea is reasonably well known in gardens but requires excellent drainage and needs some overhead protection. It can be grown from cuttings but more success has been achieved by grafting onto Darwinia citriodora rootstock.

References

carnea
Endemic flora of Western Australia
Endangered flora of Australia
Myrtales of Australia
Rosids of Western Australia
Plants described in 1923
Narrogin, Western Australia